Wine is an alcoholic beverage made from fermented grape juice.

Wine may also refer to:

Entertainment
 Wine (1913 film), a comedy short starring Fatty Arbuckle
 Wine (1924 film), an American comedy-drama directed by Louis J. Gasnier
 "Wine" (song), by Suran featuring Changmo from the 2017 EP Walkin
 Wine (dance), Caribbean style of dance
 "Wine", a song by Taeyeon from the 2019 album Purpose
 "Wine", a song by Teenage Joans from the 2021 EP Taste of Me
 WINE (AM), a Connecticut, US radio station
 WUFO, a New York, US, radio station which formerly used the call sign WINE

People
Wine (surname)
Wine (bishop) (died before 672)

Other
Wine (software), a program designed to allow Microsoft Windows applications to run on Unix-like operating systems
Wine (color)

See also
 Red Wine (disambiguation)